Bing is a wheat flour-based Chinese food with a flattened or disk-like shape. These foods may resemble the flatbreads, pancakes, pies and unleavened dough foods of non-Chinese cuisines. Many of them are similar to the Indian roti, French crêpes, Salvadoran pupusa, or Mexican tortilla, while others are more similar to cakes and cookies.

The term is Chinese but may also refer to flatbreads or cakes of other cultures. The crêpe and the pizza, for instance, are referred to as keli bing (可麗餅) and pisa bing (披薩餅) respectively, based on the sound of their Latin names and the flour tortilla is known as Mexican thin bing (墨西哥薄餅) based on its country of origin.

Types
Bing are usually a casual food and generally eaten for lunch, but they can also be incorporated into formal meals. Both Peking duck and moo shu pork are rolled up in thin wheat flour bao bing with scallions and sweet bean sauce or hoisin sauce. Bing may also have a filling such as ground meat. Bing are commonly cooked on a skillet or griddle although some are baked.

Some common types include:
Cong you bing (蔥油餅; scallions and oil bing)
Fa mian bing (發麵餅; yeast-risen bing)
Laobing (烙餅; pan fried bing)
Chun bing (春餅; spring pancake), a thin, Northern bing traditionally eaten to celebrate the beginning of spring. Usually eaten with a variety of fillings.
Shaobing (燒餅; baked bing)
Jianbing (煎餅; fried egg pancake, similar to crepes), a popular breakfast streetfood in China.
Bó bǐng (薄饼; literally "thin pancakes"), a thin circular crepe-like wrapper or "skin" (薄餅皮) wrapping various fillings. This is sometimes called "Mandarin pancake" or "moo shu pancake" (木须饼, mù xū bǐng) in American Chinese food contexts.
Luóbo si bing (萝卜絲餅, shredded radish bing), a type of panfried bing consisting of a wheat dough skin filled with shredded radish
Rou jia bing (肉夹饼), also called rou jia mo refers to a bing that is sliced open and filled with meat, typically stewed pork or lamb meat. Some variants, such as niu rou jia bing (腊牛肉夹馍) use sesame bread and are filled with beef meat and pickled carrots and daikon, similar to a banh mi.
Hé yè bǐng (荷叶饼; a foldable bing made to represent a lotus leaf), used to accompany many rich meat stuffings and popularized by the gua bao, a variation with red-cooked pork belly.
Jin bing (筋饼) is a layered bing that is made with high-gluten flour (jin (筋) meaning gluten) popular in Northern China. It is also known as zhua bing (抓饼) since its layers can be grabbed (zhua (抓) meaning grab) at with hands. 
Guokui (锅盔) 

The Yuèbǐng (月餅; mooncakes), whilst sharing the name bing, is really a baked sweet pastry usually produced and eaten at the mid-autumn festival. Some other dessert bings are "Wife" cake (老婆饼), which contains winter melon, and the sweetened version of 1000 layer cake (千层饼) which contains tianmianjiang, sugar, and five spice or cinnamon.

Bings are also eaten in other East Asian cultures, the most common being the Korean Jeon which often contain seafood.

In Japan, the character 餅 usually refers to mochi (glutinous rice cakes), but is also used for some other foods including senbei rice crackers, written with the same characters as but quite different from jianbing.  Most Japanese bing-type cooked wheat cakes, both sweet and savoury, are instead called yaki, as in dorayaki, taiyaki, okonomiyaki, etc.

See also

References

Chinese breads
Flatbreads